Panthera onca mesembrina is an extinct subspecies of the jaguar that was endemic to southern South America during the Pleistocene epoch (1.8 mya–11,000 years ago). Its fossils have been excavated primarily in Argentina and Chile, though few fossils are known. Genetic analysis in 2016 showed that P. onca mesembrina was in an extinct sister lineage to extant Panthera onca species based on genetic evidence, and is the largest known subspecies of jaguar.

History and taxonomy 

In the 1890s in the “Cueva del Milodon” in southern Chile, fossil collector Rodolfo Hauthal collected a fragmentary postcranial skeleton of a large Felid that he sent to Santiago Roth who described them as a new genus and species of Felid, "Iemish listai", in 1899, though the name is considered a nomen nudum. 5 years later in 1904, Roth reassessed the phylogenetic affinities of “Iemish” and moved the species to Felis, referring several cranial and fragmentary postcranial elements to the taxon. Notably, 2 fragmentary mandibles, a partial skull, and pieces of skin were some of the specimens referred in 1904. 30 years later in 1934, Felis onca mesembrina was properly named by Angel Cabrera based on that partial skull, likely from a male, from “Cueva del Milodon” and the other material from the site was referred to it. Unfortunately, the skull (MLP 10-90) was lost, and was only illustrated by Cabrera and Roth. Later, more material, including feces and mandibles, was referred to as F. onca mesembrina from the island of Tierra del Fuego, Argentina and other sites in southern Chile. One site in Última Esperanza, Chile was excavated in the 1980s and 90s and bore many fossils, including those of juveniles and old adults. All material from P. onca mesembrina dates to the late Pleistocene.

In 2016, the subspecies was found to belong to Panthera onca in a genetic study, which supported its identity as a unique subspecies of jaguar. Later in 2017, the subspecies was synonymized with Panthera atrox based on morphological similarities of all material, although these similarities are unreliable and the subspecies is valid.

Fossil distribution 
Fossils have been uncovered from southern Chile at "Cueva del Milodon", the southernmost site of any jaguar recorded, to possibly Formosa Province in Argentina, the northernmost record of the subspecies.  In 2021, fossils from Cuvieri Cave in Minas Gerais, Brazil were referred to P. onca and possibly belong to P. onca mesembrina. The cave contains many fossils from several individuals of differing growth stages preserved alongside other taxa, such as Smilodon populator and Catonyx cuvieri, and are the only fossils known of the subspecies from outside Argentina and Chile.

Description and Paleobiology

Size 
Of the many Panthera onca subspecies, none is as large as that of Panthera onca mesembrina, with an estimated body mass of 231.23 kilograms in 2017 based on the material from the "Cueva del Milodon". This size not only places it as far larger than any other known Panthera onca by as much as 90 kg, but was among the largest known felids with the mass being in the range of felids as big as Smilodon populator and Panthera atrox. The trend of large body size among Pleistocene felids was likely due to a multitude of factors, mostly prey size and the different environmental conditions of the epoch, with the North American P. onca augusta being 15-20% larger than modern P. onca augusta at around 190 kg. The focused prey size was also calculated in 2017, at 663.4 kilograms, the prey range is also one of the greatest known from any Felid, with evidence of bite marks on Mylodon and other large fossil mammals supporting this.

Skin and coloration 
In 1904, Santiago Roth described pieces of skin from the face and limbs, along with a piece of leather, from the previously mentioned site at "Cueva del Milodon". The skin from the face shows a reddish brown color tone, and the skin from the limbs preserves a yellowish colored stripe. A cave painting from El Ceibo in the Santa Cruz Province of Argentina seems to confirm this, and reduce the possibility of confusion with other jaguars, as similar cave paintings accurately depict jaguars as yellow in color. The painting is depicted alongside those of guanacos and humans and is the likely only known depiction of the taxon by Pre-Columbians.

Behavior 
Evidence of social groups has been found in the lost holotype of Panthera onca mesembrina in the form of a shallow irregular pit on the lateral surface of the maxilla-nasal suture posterior to the ascending process of the premaxilla; this represents a puncture by the canine made by other jaguars, healed during life. As George Simpson described in 1941, all extant collected specimens with these punctures were males, and no females with such scars have been found. The presence of a puncture on the lateral surface of the skull suggests that the specimen was a male based on this social behavior between male living jaguars.

In the type site at “Cueva del Milodon”, fossils of Mylodon, Hippidion, and many other Pleistocene herbivores have been found with tooth and scratch marks that match the teeth of P. onca mesembrina. The majority of the fossils found were limb elements, the same circumstance happens with modern Panthera species' burrows and caves where food is taken. The fossils notably were of very large sizes, including bite marks on the skull of the 3-4 meter ground sloth Mylodon, the largest animal found in the cave. Coprolites containing many Mylodon dermal ossicles was found in the cave, the coprolite likely belonging to P. onca mesembrina.

The majority of sites where P. onca mesembrina has been found in Argentina and Chile were very open and arid, contrasting to the lush rainforest habitats of modern jaguars.

See also 

 Panthera onca augusta
 Panthera gombaszoegensis
 South American jaguar

References 

Panthera onca mesembrina
onca mesembrina
Pleistocene carnivorans
Pleistocene first appearances
Pleistocene extinctions
Pleistocene mammals of South America
Lujanian
Pleistocene Brazil
Fossils of Brazil
Pleistocene Chile
Fossils of Chile
Fossil taxa described in 1934
Pleistocene Argentina